In physics, black hole thermodynamics is the area of study that seeks to reconcile the laws of thermodynamics with the existence of black hole event horizons.  As the study of the statistical mechanics of black-body radiation led to the development of the theory of quantum mechanics, the effort to understand the statistical mechanics of black holes has had a deep impact upon the understanding of quantum gravity, leading to the formulation of the holographic principle.

Overview
The second law of thermodynamics requires that black holes have entropy. If black holes carried no entropy, it would be possible to violate the second law by throwing mass into the black hole. The increase of the entropy of the black hole more than compensates for the decrease of the entropy carried by the object that was swallowed.

In 1972, Jacob Bekenstein conjectured that black holes should have an entropy, where by the same year, he proposed no-hair theorems.

In 1973 Bekenstein suggested  as the constant of proportionality, asserting that if the constant was not exactly this, it must be very close to it. The next year, in 1974, Stephen Hawking showed that black holes emit thermal Hawking radiation corresponding to a certain temperature (Hawking temperature). Using the thermodynamic relationship between energy, temperature and entropy, Hawking was able to confirm Bekenstein's conjecture and fix the constant of proportionality at :

This is often referred to as the Bekenstein–Hawking formula. The subscript BH either stands for "black hole" or "Bekenstein–Hawking". The black hole entropy is proportional to the area of its event horizon . The fact that the black hole entropy is also the maximal entropy that can be obtained by the Bekenstein bound (wherein the Bekenstein bound becomes an equality) was the main observation that led to the holographic principle. This area relationship was generalized to arbitrary regions via the Ryu–Takayanagi formula, which relates the entanglement entropy of a boundary conformal field theory to a specific surface in its dual gravitational theory.

Although Hawking's calculations gave further thermodynamic evidence for black hole entropy, until 1995 no one was able to make a controlled calculation of black hole entropy based on statistical mechanics, which associates entropy with a large number of microstates.  In fact, so called "no-hair" theorems appeared to suggest that black holes could have only a single microstate.  The situation changed in 1995 when Andrew Strominger and Cumrun Vafa calculated the right Bekenstein–Hawking entropy of a supersymmetric black hole in string theory, using methods based on D-branes and string duality. Their calculation was followed by many similar computations of entropy of large classes of other extremal and near-extremal black holes, and the result always agreed with the Bekenstein–Hawking formula. However, for the Schwarzschild black hole, viewed as the most far-from-extremal black hole, the relationship between micro- and macrostates has not been characterized. Efforts to develop an adequate answer within the framework of string theory continue.

In loop quantum gravity (LQG) it is possible to associate a geometrical interpretation with the microstates: these are the quantum geometries of the horizon. LQG offers a geometric explanation of the finiteness of the entropy and of the proportionality of the area of the horizon.  It is possible to derive, from the covariant formulation of full quantum theory (spinfoam) the correct relation between energy and area (1st law), the Unruh temperature and the distribution that yields Hawking entropy. The calculation makes use of the notion of dynamical horizon and is done for non-extremal black holes. There seems to be also discussed the calculation of Bekenstein–Hawking entropy from the point of view of loop quantum gravity. The current accepted microstate ensemble for black holes is the microcanonical ensemble. The partition function for black holes results in a negative heat capacity. In canonical ensembles, there is limitation for a positive heat capacity, whereas microcanonical ensembles can exist at a negative heat capacity.

The laws of black hole mechanics 
The four laws of black hole mechanics are physical properties that black holes are believed to satisfy. The laws, analogous to the laws of thermodynamics, were discovered by Jacob Bekenstein, Brandon Carter, and James Bardeen. Further considerations were made by Stephen Hawking.

Statement of the laws
The laws of black hole mechanics are expressed in geometrized units.

The zeroth law
The horizon has constant surface gravity for a stationary black hole.

The first law
For perturbations of stationary black holes, the change of energy is related to change of area, angular momentum, and electric charge by

The second law 

The horizon area is, assuming the weak energy condition, a non-decreasing function of time:

This "law" was superseded by Hawking's discovery that black holes radiate, which causes both the black hole's mass and the area of its horizon to decrease over time.

The third law 

It is not possible to form a black hole with vanishing surface gravity. That is,  cannot be achieved.

Discussion of the laws

The zeroth law 

The zeroth law is analogous to the zeroth law of thermodynamics, which states that the temperature is constant throughout a body in thermal equilibrium.  It suggests that the surface gravity is analogous to temperature. T constant for thermal equilibrium for a normal system is analogous to  constant over the horizon of a stationary black hole.

The first law 
The left side, is the change in energy (proportional to mass).  Although the first term does not have an immediately obvious physical interpretation, the second and third terms on the right side represent changes in energy due to rotation and electromagnetism. Analogously, the first law of thermodynamics is a statement of energy conservation, which contains on its right side the term .

The second law 
The second law is the statement of Hawking's area theorem.  Analogously, the second law of thermodynamics states that the change in entropy in an isolated system will be greater than or equal to 0 for a spontaneous process, suggesting a link between entropy and the area of a black hole horizon. However, this version violates the second law of thermodynamics by matter losing (its) entropy as it falls in, giving a decrease in entropy. However, generalizing the second law as the sum of black hole entropy and outside entropy, shows that the second law of thermodynamics is not violated in a system including the universe beyond the horizon.

The generalized second law of thermodynamics (GSL) was needed to present the second law of thermodynamics as valid. This is because the second law of thermodynamics, as a result of the disappearance of entropy near the exterior of black holes, is not useful. The GSL allows for the application of the law because now the measurement of interior, common entropy is possible. The validity of the GSL can be established by studying an example, such as looking at a system having entropy that falls into a bigger, non-moving black hole, and establishing upper and lower entropy bounds for the increase in the black hole entropy and entropy of the system, respectively. One should also note that the GSL will hold for theories of gravity such as Einstein gravity, Lovelock gravity, or Braneworld gravity, because the conditions to use GSL for these can be met.

However, on the topic of black hole formation, the question becomes whether or not the generalized second law of thermodynamics will be valid, and if it is, it will have been proved valid for all situations. Because a black hole formation is not stationary, but instead moving, proving that the GSL holds is difficult. Proving the GSL is generally valid would require using quantum-statistical mechanics, because the GSL is both a quantum and statistical law. This discipline does not exist so the GSL can be assumed to be useful in general, as well as for prediction.

The third law 
Extremal black holes have vanishing surface gravity. Stating that  cannot go to zero is analogous to the third law of thermodynamics, which states that the entropy of a system at absolute zero is a well defined constant. This is because a system at zero temperature exists in its ground state. Furthermore,  will reach zero at zero temperature, but  itself will also reach zero, at least for perfect crystalline substances. No experimentally verified violations of the laws of thermodynamics are known yet.

Interpretation of the laws 
The four laws of black hole mechanics suggest that one should identify the surface gravity of a black hole with temperature and the area of the event horizon with entropy, at least up to some multiplicative constants.  If one only considers black holes classically, then they have zero temperature and, by the no-hair theorem, zero entropy, and the laws of black hole mechanics remain an analogy.  However, when quantum-mechanical effects are taken into account, one finds that black holes emit thermal radiation (Hawking radiation) at a temperature

From the first law of black hole mechanics, this determines the multiplicative constant of the Bekenstein–Hawking entropy, which is (in geometrized units)

which is the entropy of the black hole in Einstein's general relativity. Quantum field theory in curved spacetime can be utilized to calculate the entropy for a black hole in any covariant theory for gravity, known as the Wald entropy.

Quantum gravitational corrections to the entropy
The Hawking formula for the entropy receives corrections as soon as quantum effects are taken into account. Any UV finite theory of quantum gravity should reduce at low energy to General Relativity. Works pioneered by Barvinsky and Vilkovisky  suggest as a starting point up to second order in curvature the following action, consisting of local and non-local terms:

where  is an energy scale. The exact values of the coefficients  are unknown, as they depend on the nature of the ultra-violet theory of quantum gravity.   is an operator with the integral representation

The new additional terms in the action modify the classical Einstein equations of motion. This implies that a given classical metric receives quantum corrections, which in turn shift the classical position of the event horizon. When computing the Wald entropy, one then takes the shifted position  of the event horizon into account:

This method was applied in 2021 by Calmet et al. for Schwarzschild black holes. The Schwarzschild metric does not receive quantum corrections at second order in curvature and the entropy is

A generalisation for charged (Reissner-Nordström) black holes was subsequently carried out by Campos Delgado.

Critique
While black hole thermodynamics (BHT) has been regarded as one of the deepest clues to a quantum theory of gravity, there remained some philosophical criticisms that it “is often based on a kind of caricature of thermodynamics” and "it’s unclear what the systems in BHT are supposed to be", leading to the conclusion -- "the analogy is not nearly as good as is commonly supposed".

These criticisms triggered a fellow skeptic to reexamine "the case for regarding black holes as thermodynamic systems", with particular attention paid to "the central role of Hawking radiation in permitting black holes to be in thermal contact with one another" and "the interpretation of Hawking radiation close to the black hole as a gravitationally bound thermal atmosphere", ending with the opposite conclusion -- "stationary black holes are not analogous to thermodynamic systems: they are thermodynamic systems, in the fullest sense."

Beyond black holes
Gary Gibbons and Hawking have shown that black hole thermodynamics is more general than black holes—that cosmological event horizons also have an entropy and temperature.

More fundamentally, 't Hooft and Susskind used the laws of black hole thermodynamics to argue for a general holographic principle of nature, which asserts that consistent theories of gravity and quantum mechanics must be lower-dimensional.  Though not yet fully understood in general, the holographic principle is central to theories like the AdS/CFT correspondence.

There are also connections between black hole entropy and fluid surface tension.

See also
 Joseph Polchinski
 Robert Wald

Notes

Citations

Bibliography

External links
 Bekenstein-Hawking entropy on Scholarpedia
 Black Hole Thermodynamics
 Black hole entropy on arxiv.org

Black holes
Branches of thermodynamics